Calvin Demery (born August 17, 1950) is a former American football wide receiver. He played for the Minnesota Vikings in 1972.

References

1950 births
Living people
Players of American football from Phoenix, Arizona
American football wide receivers
Arizona State Sun Devils football players
Minnesota Vikings players